The Old Martin County Court House, built in 1937, is a historic Art Deco style courthouse building located at 80 East Ocean Boulevard in Stuart, Martin County, Florida. In 1989, it was listed in A Guide to Florida's Historic Architecture, published by the University of Florida Press. On November 7, 1997, it was added to the U.S. National Register of Historic Places.  On March 15, 2007, it was added to the Martin County Historic Register by the Martin County Historic Preservation Board. It is now known as the Courthouse Cultural Center and is the headquarters of the Arts Council, Inc., the designated local arts agency for Martin County.

Building history
The building was designed by architect  L. Phillips Clarke of West Palm Beach and built by Chalker & Lund of poured concrete walls with terrazzo floors in the Art Deco style for the WPA as a northern addition to the first Martin County courthouse, which had been built in 1908 as a Palm Beach County public school building and converted to courthouse use after Martin County was created in 1925. The four words, Martin County Court House, were prominently etched into the front of the addition, where they still remain. Because of this, both the National Register and the Cultural Center have retained the two-word spelling of courthouse even though the one-word version is the preferred one.

In 1954, the county bought a building to the west that had been used as an automobile dealership by Web Ordway Ford and later as an A & P grocery store and converted it into a courthouse annex. At the same time, the county extended the original courthouse and the 1937 addition west to abut the annex and joined their hallways. The county also extended the 1937 addition and the old school house on the east side. Both of these 1954 additions were bland, utilitarian structures of no particular architectural merit.

Later when the county outgrew this assemblage of buildings, it decided to build a new courthouse and constitutional officers complex to the south of the original courthouse and to tear down the original courthouse, all additions and the annex. The City of Stuart, though, with much public support, prevailed on the county commission to save the 1937 addition and to use it as a cultural center. There was some sentiment to save the original schoolhouse building, but this was determined not to be feasible.

Resources
 Florida's Historic Courthouses by Hampton Dunn

References

External links

 1964 Stuart, Florida, Travelogue by E. W. Dutton
 Martin County listings at National Register of Historic Places
 Court House Cultural Center at Florida's Office of Cultural and Historical Programs
 Martin County Courthouse at Florida's Historic Courthouses Note this website features a picture of 1he 1937 addition shortly after it was built.
 ArchiPlanet Listing

County courthouses in Florida
National Register of Historic Places in Martin County, Florida
Art Deco architecture in Florida
Art Deco courthouses
Martin County Local Historic Register
Works Progress Administration in Florida
1937 establishments in Florida
Government buildings completed in 1937